The Bat People is a 1974 American horror film directed by Jerry Jameson, written and produced by Lou Shaw, and distributed by  American International Pictures. Starring Stewart Moss and Marianne McAndrew, the film tells the story of a doctor, who after being bitten by a bat in a cave, undergoes an accelerating transformation into a man-bat creature.

The Bat People is also known by two alternative titles: It Lives By Night and It's Alive. The film was lampooned in a 1999 episode of Mystery Science Theater 3000.

Plot
Dr. John Beck, recently married, decides to take his wife, Cathy, spelunking in Carlsbad Caverns for their honeymoon.  While they're on a tour, the couple gets lost in the bat cave. Dr. Beck, who specializes in bats, is bitten by a fruit bat.  He then inexplicably begins to transform into a vampire bat. He visits a doctor who attempts to help his condition. Unfortunately the doctor's treatment does not seem to be working.  In fact, it is aggravating his condition.  As he begins to transform, Dr. Beck unwittingly goes on a killing spree, catching the attention of the cruel Sergeant Ward. The doctor begins to wonder if Dr. Beck is just imagining everything, and suggests that he seek a psychiatrist. Beck returns to the original cave to seek solace. In the end, Cathy becomes a vampire (after having sex with Beck) and rejoins her husband in the bat cave.

Cast
Stewart Moss as Dr. John Beck 
Marianne McAndrew as Cathy Beck
Michael Pataki as Sgt. Ward
Paul Carr as Dr. Kipling
Arthur Space as the Tramp
Robert Berk as the Motel Owner
Pat Delaney as Ms. Jax 
George Paulsin as Boy in Pickup 
Bonnie Van Dyke as Girl in Pickup
Jennifer Kulik as Nurse/Victim (credited as Jeni Kulik)
Laurie Brooks Jefferson as Nurse
Herb Pierce as Park Ranger (Uncredited)

Release

Theatrical release

The film performed poorly at the box office.

Home media
The film was released on DVD by MGM as a double feature with The Beast Within on September 11, 2007. It was later released by Shout! Factory as a 4-film horror set on April 15, 2014. Shout! Factory released the film for the first time on Blu-ray on July 18, 2017.

Reception

The Bat People was widely panned by critics.

Dave Sindelar, on his website Fantastic Movie Musings and Ramblings gave the film a negative review, calling it "forgettable". In his review of the film, Sindelar criticized the film's "leisurely pace", overuse of close-ups, and conclusion. VideoHound's Golden Movie Retriever awarded the film one out of four bones, calling it "[a] Less-than-gripping horror flick". TV Guide awarded the film two out of five stars, commending the films special effects but criticizing the film's script and "mediocre" acting. The Terror Trap gave the film 2/4 stars, writing, "this 1974 drive-in horror boasts some beautiful snowy vistas and picturesque desert landscapes. But that's not enough to save it from being overly sleepy, and poorly paced."

See also
 List of American films of 1974

References

External links

Mystery Science Theater 3000 
 
 Episode guide: 1010- IT Lives By Night

1974 films
1974 horror films
1970s American films
1970s English-language films
1970s monster movies
Films about bats
American monster movies
American vampire films
American International Pictures films
Films directed by Jerry Jameson
Films scored by Artie Kane
Films set in New Mexico